Grith Ejstrup (born 5 July 1953) is a Danish athlete. She competed in the women's high jump at the 1972 Summer Olympics.

References

1953 births
Living people
Athletes (track and field) at the 1972 Summer Olympics
Danish female high jumpers
Olympic athletes of Denmark
Place of birth missing (living people)